St Edmund's Church, Castleton, is a Grade II* listed parish church in the Church of England in Castleton, Derbyshire.

History

The church dates from the 12th century, and has some 14th-century elements. Alterations were carried out in 1831 when the south porch was built, and the aisles were demolished. A restoration was carried out in 1886 by Hill Brothers of Tideswell.

The tower of St. Edmund's contains a ring of eight bells, with the heaviest six cast in 1802, and two trebles cast in 1812. All bells were cast by James II Harrison, and are unusual for their light weight (11 hundredweight), while being in the key of E-flat. Modern, tuned bells in this key normally weigh in the region of 20 hundredweight.

Vicars

Parish status

The church is in a joint parish with
St Barnabas' Church, Bradwell
St Peter's Church, Hope

Organ

The church contains a pipe organ by Brindley and Foster. A specification of the organ can be found on the National Pipe Organ Register.

Stained glass

See also
Grade II* listed buildings in High Peak
Listed buildings in Castleton, Derbyshire

References

Church of England church buildings in Derbyshire
Grade II* listed churches in Derbyshire